Tian Jia (born 9 February 1981 in Tianjin) is a female Chinese professional beach volleyball player.

Career 
Tian won the bronze medal in the women's team competition at the 2005 Beach Volleyball World Championships in Berlin, Germany, partnering Wang Fei. She competed at the Sydney 2000 and the Athens 2004 Games.

At the 2008 Summer Olympics in Beijing, Tian and her partner Wang Jie won the silver medal in the women's beach volleyball competition, going undefeated until losing in the final to Misty May-Treanor and Kerri Walsh of the United States.

Sponsors 
Swatch

References

External links
 
 

1981 births
Living people
Chinese female beach volleyball players
Olympic beach volleyball players of China
Olympic silver medalists for China
Olympic medalists in beach volleyball
Asian Games medalists in beach volleyball
Asian Games gold medalists for China
Asian Games bronze medalists for China
Medalists at the 2002 Asian Games
Medalists at the 2006 Asian Games
Medalists at the 2008 Summer Olympics
Beach volleyball players at the 2000 Summer Olympics
Beach volleyball players at the 2002 Asian Games
Beach volleyball players at the 2004 Summer Olympics
Beach volleyball players at the 2006 Asian Games
Beach volleyball players at the 2008 Summer Olympics
Volleyball players from Tianjin